Edésio Sérgio Ribeiro de Oliveira Junior, or simply Junior, (born on October 5, 1981) is a Brazilian footballer that currently plays for Kanbawza FC in the Myanmar National League.

References

External links

1981 births
Association football midfielders
Brazilian expatriate footballers
Brazilian expatriate sportspeople in Indonesia
Brazilian footballers
Expatriate footballers in Indonesia
Associação Olímpica de Itabaiana players
Botafogo Futebol Clube (SP) players
Volta Redonda FC players
Clube Atlético Joseense players
Liga 1 (Indonesia) players
Living people
Persijap Jepara players
Deltras F.C. players
Persela Lamongan players
Indonesian Premier Division players